Lyubov Fyodorovna Dostoevskaya (14 September 1869 – 10 November 1926), also known by the name Aimée Dostoyevskaya, was a Russian writer, memoirist, and the second daughter of famous writer Fyodor Dostoevsky and his wife Anna. Their first, Sonya, was born in 1868 and died the same year.

Lyubov never married. Later in her life she became estranged from her mother and moved out of their house. In 1913, after a trip abroad for medical treatment, Lyubov decided to stay there, and she lived abroad until her death in 1926. At that period she was also known by the name Aimée Dostoyevskaya. She died in Italy of pernicious anemia.

Although Lyubov Dostoevskaya was Orthodox, the funeral rite was Catholic by mistake. A simple wooden cross on her grave was soon replaced by a small porphyry tomb. In 1931 Italia Letteraria magazine suggested that since Dostoevskaya was buried in Italy, it was the Italian government that should establish a memorial. In December 1931 a granite pedestal was constructed, with an epitaph written by the editor of Venezia Tridentina magazine. Resting place of Fyodor Dostoevsky's daughter in Gries has been preserved after cemetery reconstruction. Her tomb was moved to Bolzano city's cemetery in 1957.

Works 

Lyubov Dostoevskaya is best known for the book Dostoyevsky as Portrayed by His Daughter (also known as Dostoyevsky According to His Daughter), originally published in Munich in 1920. Her memoirs, written in French and published in German, were later translated into other European languages. In 1920 the book was released in Dutch (in Arnhem), the following year there were translations into Swedish and English, and in 1922 it was published in the United States and Italy. A Russian version, highly abridged, was published in 1922 by Gosudarstvennoe Izdatelstvo (Saint Petersburg) under the title "Достоевский в изображении его дочери Л. Достоевской".

The work contains many factual inaccuracies, partly because Lyubov was only 11 at the time of her father's death, and partly because she based the memoirs on her mother's stories. Many researchers tend to see this memoir as subjective and unreliable, citing as an example her bias in the description of the relationship between Dostoevsky and his first wife, Mariya Isayeva. Both Lyubov and her mother Anna expressed hatred towards Isayeva.

Her other works include the short story collection Bolnye devushki (1911), and the novels Emigrantka (Эмигрантка; 1912) and Advokatka (Адвокатка; 1913).

English translations
The Emigrant, (Novel), Constable and Co, London, 1916. from Archive.org
Fyodor Dostoyevsky: A Study, Yale University Press, 1922. from Archive.org

References

See also 

1869 births
1926 deaths
Fyodor Dostoyevsky
Women writers from the Russian Empire
20th-century women writers
Deaths from pernicious anemia
Russian memoirists
Emigrants from the Russian Empire to Italy
Lyubov
Women memoirists